Jacopo Comin (1901–1973) was an Italian film producer, writer, and director.

Selected filmography
 Summer Storm (1949)
The Rival of the Empress (1951)
 Without a Flag (1951)

External links
 

Italian film producers
Italian directors
1901 births
1973 deaths